Senator Connor may refer to:

Frank Connor (politician) (1916–1982), Washington State Senate
Henry G. Connor (1852–1924), North Carolina State Senate
Henry William Connor (1793–1866), North Carolina State Senate
Martin Connor (born 1945), New York State Senate
Nick Connor (1904–1995), Florida State Senate

See also
Senator Conner (disambiguation)
Senator Connors (disambiguation)